Bidhnu is a town in Kanpur district in the state of Uttar Pradesh, India . This town is 10 miles from, the historical heritage, bhitargaon temple. Due to differences in languages and dialects over time, the word Vishnu became popular with Bidhanu. Kathara, khersa , bidhnoo, afazalpur and ramaipur are most populated gram panchayat of Bidhanu development block. bidhnu is a Development Block in Kanpur nagar tehsil and comes under Kanpur Metropolitan Area.

Transport
Bidhnu is well connected by road through NH 86.

Geography
It has an average elevation of 123 meters (406 feet).

Cities and towns in Kanpur Nagar district